This is the discography for American pop and country musician Bobby Goldsboro.

Albums

Compilation albums 
This is Bobby Goldsboro (1969) Sunset
Pledge of Love  (1970) Sunset
Autumn of My Life (1971) Sunset
I Believe in Music (1976) Sunset (Canada)
Greatest hits of Bobby Goldsboro (1978) Sunset (UK)
Voice of Honey Sunset (Germany)
Bobby Goldsboro Gold (1977) K-tel (Canada/Australia) - #59 AUS
Love Songs (1980) Suffolk
Best of Bobby Goldsboro (1981) Liberty
The Very Best of Bobby Goldsboro (1989) C5 (UK)
Doral Presents Bobby Goldsboro
United Artists Music publishing Group Presents Songs of Bobby Goldsboro (1974) United Artists
All-Time Greatest Hits (1990) Curb
Honey (1990) BMG
Summer the first time (1994)U.K. Curb
Greatest Hits (1995) EMI Special Market
22 Greatest Hits (1995) Remember RMB 75084
Honey/Summer (1998) BGO
Hello Summertime (1999) EMI
Greatest Hits Collection (1999) Platinum Entertainment
It's Too Late/Today (2002) BGO
Absolutely the Best (2003) Fuel 2000
Best of Bobby Goldsboro, Vol.1 (2004) (2008) Curb
Best of Bobby Goldsboro, Vol, 2 (2004) (2008) Curb
Honey (2005) CBUJ Entertainment
Brand New Kind of Love (2005) with DVD BCI Music
Honey/We Gotta Start Lovin (2006) Collectables
Very Best of Bobby Goldsboro (2007) EMI
Greatest Hits (2010) Membran
With pen in hand (2019) Hump Head 2CD set
Very best of Bobby Goldsboro (2020) Not Now Music 2CD set

Related albums
 Gator Original Motion Picture Soundtrack album included "For a Little While", composed and performed by Bobby Goldsboro (1976) UA
 Children of the World included "Kids are People, Too" by Bobby Goldsboro (1980) Cleveland International
 The In Crowd included rare recordings, including "Why Must I Be" by Bobby Goldsboro, Design Records
 Fred Carter, Jr. plays Bobby Goldsboro (1964) was produced by Bobby Goldsboro, United Artists

Singles
{| class="wikitable"
! rowspan="2"| Year
! rowspan="2"| Single (A-side, B-side)Both sides from same album except where indicated
! colspan="9"| Chart Positions
! rowspan="2"| Album
|-
! width="45"| US Country
! width="45"| US
! width="45"| USCashbox
! width="45"| US AC
! width="45"| CAN Country
! width="45"| CAN
! width="45"| CAN AC
! width="45"| UK
! width="45"| IRE
|-
|rowspan="2"|1962
|"You Better Go Home"b/w "Lonely Traveler"
|align="center"| –
|align="center"| –
|align="center"| –
|align="center"| –
|align="center"| –
|align="center"| –
|align="center"| –
|align="center"| –
|align="center"| –
|rowspan="4"|Non-album tracks
|-
|"Molly"b/w "Honey Baby"
|align="center"| –
|align="center"| 70
|align="center"| 60
|align="center"| 17
|align="center"| –
|align="center"| –
|align="center"| –
|align="center"| –
|align="center"| –
|-
| rowspan="3"|1963
|"The Runaround"b/w"The Letter"
|align="center"| –
|align="center"| –
|align="center"| –
|align="center"| –
|align="center"| –
|align="center"| –
|align="center"| –
|align="center"| –
|align="center"| –
|-
|"That's What Love Will Do"b/w "Light the Candles (Throw the Rice)"
|align="center"| –
|align="center"| –
|align="center"| –
|align="center"| –
|align="center"| –
|align="center"| –
|align="center"| –
|align="center"| –
|align="center"| –
|-
|"See the Funny Little Clown" 1b/w "Hello Loser"
|align="center"| –
|align="center"| 9
|align="center"| 10
|align="center"| 3
|align="center"| –
|align="center"| –
|align="center"| –
|align="center"| –
|align="center"| –
|rowspan="2"| The Bobby Goldsboro Album
|-
|rowspan="4"|1964
| "Whenever He Holds You"b/w "If She Was Mine" (from Little Things)
|align="center"| –
|align="center"| 39
|align="center"| 41
|align="center"| 13
|align="center"| –
|align="center"| –
|align="center"| –
|align="center"| –
|align="center"| –
|-
|"Me Japanese Boy I Love You"b/w "Everyone But Me" (from I Can't Stop Loving You)
|align="center"| –
|align="center"| 74
|align="center"| 83
|align="center"| 14
|align="center"| –
|align="center"| 39
|align="center"| –
|align="center"| –
|align="center"| –
| rowspan="3"| Little Things
|-
|"I Don't Know You Anymore"b/w "Little Drops of Water" 
|align="center"| –
|align="center"| 105
|align="center"| 136
|align="center"| –
|align="center"| –
|align="center"| –
|align="center"| –
|align="center"| –
|align="center"| –
|-
|"Little Things" 1b/w "I Can't Go On Pretending" (from I Can't Stop Loving You)
|align="center"| –
|align="center"| 13
|align="center"| 12
|align="center"| –
|align="center"| –
|align="center"| 4
|align="center"| 4
|align="center"| –
|align="center"| –
|-
|rowspan="4"|1965
|"Voodoo Woman"b/w "It Breaks My Heart"
|align="center"| –
|align="center"| 27
|align="center"| 27
|align="center"| –
|align="center"| –
|align="center"| 6
|align="center"| –
|align="center"| –
|align="center"| –
|rowspan="4"|Broomstick Cowboy
|-
|"If You Wait for Love" /
|align="center"| –
|align="center"| 75
|align="center"| 97
|align="center"| –
|align="center"| –
|align="center"| –
|align="center"| –
|align="center"| –
|align="center"| –
|-
|"If You've Got a Heart"
|align="center"| –
|align="center"| 60
|align="center"| 58
|align="center"| –
|align="center"| –
|align="center"| –
|align="center"| –
|align="center"| –
|align="center"| –
|-
|"Broomstick Cowboy"b/w "Ain't Got Time for Happy"
|align="center"| –
|align="center"| 53
|align="center"| 52
|align="center"| –
|align="center"| –
|align="center"| 20
|align="center"| –
|align="center"| –
|align="center"| –
|-
|rowspan="5"|1966
|"It's Too Late" 1b/w "I'm Goin' Home" (from Broomstick Cowboy)
|align="center"| –
|align="center"| 23
|align="center"| 28
|align="center"| –
|align="center"| –
|align="center"| 5
|align="center"| –
|align="center"| –
|align="center"| –
|It's Too Late
|-
|"I Know You Better Than That"b/w "When Your Love Has Gone" (from It's Too Late)
|align="center"| –
|align="center"| 56
|align="center"| 77
|align="center"| –
|align="center"| –
|align="center"| –
|align="center"| 23
|align="center"| –
|align="center"| –
| rowspan="4"| Blue Autumn
|-
|"Take Your Love"b/w "Longer Than Forever"
|align="center"| –
|align="center"| 114
|align="center"| 123
|align="center"| –
|align="center"| –
|align="center"| –
|align="center"| –
|align="center"| –
|align="center"| –
|-
|"It Hurts Me"b/w "Pity the Fool" (from Little Things)
|align="center"| –
|align="center"| –
|align="center"| 70
|align="center"| 100
|align="center"| –
|align="center"| –
|align="center"| 86
|align="center"| –
|align="center"| –
|-
|"Blue Autumn"b/w "I Just Don't Love You Anymore" (from It's Too Late)
|align="center"| –
|align="center"| 35
|align="center"| 37
|align="center"| –
|align="center"| –
|align="center"| 20
|align="center"| –
|align="center"| –
|align="center"| –
|-
|rowspan="5"|1967
|"Goodbye to All You Women" /
|align="center"| –
|align="center"| 102
|align="center"| 103
|align="center"| –
|align="center"| –
|align="center"| –
|align="center"| –
|align="center"| –
|align="center"| –
|rowspan="2"| Pledge of Love 
|-
|"Love Is"
|align="center"| –
|align="center"| – 
|align="center"| 122
|align="center"| –
|align="center"| –
|align="center"| –
|align="center"| –
|align="center"| –
|align="center"| –
|-
|"Trusty Little Herbert"b/w "Three in the Morning" (from Autumn of My Life)
|align="center"| –
|align="center"| –
|align="center"| –
|align="center"| –
|align="center"| –
|align="center"| –
|align="center"| –
|align="center"| –
|align="center"| –
|This Is Bobby Goldsboro
|-
|"Jo Jo's Place" /
|align="center"| –
|align="center"| 111
|align="center"| –
|align="center"| –
|align="center"| –
|align="center"| –
|align="center"| –
|align="center"| –
|align="center"| –
|Non-album track
|-
|"Pledge of Love"
|align="center"| –
|align="center"| 118
|align="center"| 109
|align="center"| –
|align="center"| –
|align="center"| –
|align="center"| –
|align="center"| –
|align="center"| –
|Blue Autumn
|-
|rowspan="5"|1968
|"I Just Wasted the Rest"b/w "Our Way of Life"Both sides: Del Reeves & Bobby Goldsboro
|align="center"| 56
|align="center"| –
|align="center"| –
|align="center"| –
|align="center"| –
|align="center"| –
|align="center"| –
|align="center"| –
|align="center"| –
|Our Way of Life
|-
|"Honey" 1b/w "Danny" (from Word Pictures)
|align="center"| 1
|align="center"| 1
|align="center"| 1
|align="center"| 1
|align="center"| 1
|align="center"| 1
|align="center"| –
|align="center"| 2
|align="center"| 1
|Honey
|-
|"Autumn of My Life"b/w "She Chased Me" (from Blue Autumn)
|align="center"| 15
|align="center"| 19
|align="center"| 14
|align="center"| 2
|align="center"| 2
|align="center"| 11
|align="center"| –
|align="center"| –
|align="center"| –
|rowspan="3"| Word Pictures
|-
|"The Straight Life"b/w "Tomorrow Is Forgotten" (from Today)
|align="center"| 37
|align="center"| 36
|align="center"| 29
|align="center"| 6
|align="center"| 7
|align="center"| 19
|align="center"| –
|align="center"| –
|align="center"| –
|-
|"Look Around You (It's Christmas Time)"b/w "A Christmas Wish" (Non-album track)
|align="center"| –
|align="center"| –
|align="center"| –
|align="center"| –
|align="center"| –
|align="center"| –
|align="center"| –
|align="center"| –
|align="center"| –
|-
| rowspan="4"|1969
| "Glad She's a Woman"b/w "Letter to Emily" (from Word Pictures)
|align="center"| 49
|align="center"| 61
|align="center"| 45
|align="center"| 7
|align="center"| –
|align="center"| 44
|align="center"| –
|align="center"| –
|align="center"| –
| rowspan="2"| Today
|-
|"I'm a Drifter"b/w "Hoboes and Kings" 
|align="center"| 22
|align="center"| 46
|align="center"| 44
|align="center"| 14
|align="center"| –
|align="center"| 36
|align="center"| 9
|align="center"| –
|align="center"| – 
|-
|"Muddy Mississippi Line"b/w "Richer Man Than I" (from Today)
|align="center"| 15
|align="center"| 53
|align="center"| 46
|align="center"| 10
|align="center"| 1
|align="center"| 37
|align="center"| 16
|align="center"| –
|align="center"| – 
|Muddy Mississippi Line
|-
| "Take a Little Good Will Home"b/w "She Thinks I Still Care"Both sides: Bobby Goldsboro & Del Reeves
|align="center"| 31
|align="center"| –
|align="center"| –
|align="center"| –
|align="center"| 31
|align="center"| –
|align="center"| –
|align="center"| –
|align="center"| –
|Our Way of Life
|-
|rowspan="5"|1970
|"Mornin' Mornin'"<small>b/w "Requiem" (from We Gotta Start Lovin''')</small>
|align="center"| 56
|align="center"| 78
|align="center"| 78
|align="center"| 23
|align="center"| –
|align="center"| 64
|align="center"| 18
|align="center"| –
|align="center"| –
|Muddy Mississippi Line|-
|"Can You Feel It"b/w "Time Good, Time Bad" (from Muddy Mississippi Line)
|align="center"| 71
|align="center"| 75
|align="center"| 98
|align="center"| 8
|align="center"| –
|align="center"| –
|align="center"| –
|align="center"| –
|align="center"| –
|Bobby Goldsboro's Greatest Hits|-
|"It's Gonna Change"b/w "Down on the Bayou"
|align="center"| –
|align="center"| 108
|align="center"| –
|align="center"| 38
|align="center"| –
|align="center"| –
|align="center"| –
|align="center"| –
|align="center"| –
|rowspan="3"|We Gotta Start Lovin|-
|"My God and I"b/w "World Beyond"
|align="center"| –
|align="center"| –
|align="center"| 116
|align="center"| –
|align="center"| –
|align="center"| –
|align="center"| –
|align="center"| –
|align="center"| –
|-
|"Watching Scotty Grow" 1b/w "Water Color Days"
|align="center"| 7
|align="center"| 11
|align="center"| 8
|align="center"| 1
|align="center"| 7
|align="center"| 5
|align="center"| 1
|align="center"| –
|align="center"| – 
|-
|rowspan="4"|1971
|"And I Love You So"b/w "The Gentle of a Man"
|align="center"| 48
|align="center"| 83
|align="center"| 91
|align="center"| 8
|align="center"| –
|align="center"| 93
|align="center"| 7
|align="center"| –
|align="center"| – 
|rowspan="4"| Come Back Home
|-
|"Come Back Home"b/w "I'll Remember You"
|align="center"| –
|align="center"| 69
|align="center"| 74
|align="center"| 15
|align="center"| –
|align="center"| 89
|align="center"| 17
|align="center"| –
|align="center"| – 
|-
|"Danny Is a Mirror to Me" /
|align="center"| –
|align="center"| 107
|align="center"| 119
|align="center"| 34
|align="center"| –
|align="center"| –
|align="center"| –
|align="center"| –
|align="center"| –
|-
| "A Poem for My Little Lady"
|align="center"| –
|align="center"| –
|align="center"| 130
|align="center"| 27
|align="center"| –
|align="center"| –
|align="center"| –
|align="center"| –
|align="center"| –
|-
|rowspan="2"|1972
|"California Wine"b/w "To Be With You"
|align="center"| –
|align="center"| 108
|align="center"| 113
|align="center"| 36
|align="center"| –
|align="center"| –
|align="center"| –
|align="center"| –
|align="center"| –
|California Wine
|-
|"With Pen in Hand"b/w "Southern Fried Singin' Sunday Morning" (from California Wine)
|align="center"| –
|align="center"| 94
|align="center"| 87
|align="center"| 28
|align="center"| –
|align="center"| –
|align="center"| –
|align="center"| –
|align="center"| –
|Bobby Goldsboro's Greatest Hits
|-
|rowspan="3"|1973
|"Brand New Kind of Love"b/w "Country Feelin's" (from California Wine)
|align="center"| –
|align="center"| 116
|align="center"| 104
|align="center"| 37
|align="center"| –
|align="center"| –
|align="center"| 40
|align="center"| –
|align="center"| –
| Brand New Kind of Love
|-
|"Summer (The First Time)"b/w "Childhood-1949" (from Brand New Kind of Love)
|align="center"| 100
|align="center"| 21
|align="center"| 17
|align="center"| 18
|align="center"| –
|align="center"| 19
|align="center"| 15
|align="center"| 9
|align="center"| 16
|rowspan="2"|Summer (The First Time)
|-
|"Marlena"b/w "Sing Me a Smile"
|align="center"| 52
|align="center"| –
|align="center"| 101
|align="center"| –
|align="center"| 76
|align="center"| –
|align="center"| 70
|align="center"| –
|align="center"| – 
|-
|rowspan="3"|1974
|"I Believe the South Is Gonna Rise Again"(w/ The TSU Chorus)b/w "She" (from Summer (The First Time))
|align="center"| 62
|align="center"| –
|align="center"| –
|align="center"| –
|align="center"| –
|align="center"| –
|align="center"| –
|align="center"| –
|align="center"| – 
|rowspan="2"| Through the Eyes of a Man
|-
|"Quicksand"b/w "And Then There Was Gina"
|align="center"| –
|align="center"| –
|align="center"| –
|align="center"| –
|align="center"| –
|align="center"| –
|align="center"| –
|align="center"| –
|align="center"| –
|-
|"Hello Summertime" /
|align="center"| 79
|align="center"| –
|align="center"| 112
|align="center"| 8
|align="center"| –
|align="center"| –
|align="center"| 46
|align="center"| 14
|align="center"| 18
|Hello Summertime
|-
|rowspan="2"|1975
|"And Then There Was Gina"
|align="center"| –
|align="center"| –
|align="center"| –
|align="center"| 15
|align="center"| –
|align="center"| –
|align="center"| 15
|align="center"| –
|align="center"| –
|Through the Eyes of a Man
|-
|"I Wrote a Song (Sing Along)"b/w "You Pull Me Down" (from Through the Eyes of a Man)
|align="center"| –
|align="center"| –
|align="center"| –
|align="center"| 16
|align="center"| –
|align="center"| –
|align="center"| 17
|align="center"| –
|align="center"| –
|rowspan="3"| A Butterfly for Bucky
|-
|rowspan="2"|1976
|"A Butterfly for Bucky"b/w "Another Night Alone"
|align="center"| 22
|align="center"| 101
|align="center"| 102
|align="center"| 7
|align="center"| 7
|align="center"| –
|align="center"| 12
|align="center"| –
|align="center"| –
|-
| "Reunion"b/w "She Taught Me How to Live Again"
|align="center"| –
|align="center"| –
|align="center"| –
|align="center"| –
|align="center"| –
|align="center"| –
|align="center"| –
|align="center"| –
|align="center"| –
|-
|rowspan="2"|1977
|"Me and the Elephants"b/w "I Love Music"
|align="center"| 82
|align="center"| 104
|align="center"| –
|align="center"| 6
|align="center"| –
|align="center"| –
|align="center"| 10
|align="center"| –
|align="center"| –
|rowspan="4"| Goldsboro
|-
|"The Cowboy and the Lady"b/w "Me and Millie"
|align="center"| 85
|align="center"| –
|align="center"| –
|align="center"| –
|align="center"| –
|align="center"| –
|align="center"| –
|align="center"| –
|align="center"| –
|-
|rowspan="2"|1979
|"He'll Have to Go"b/w "Too Hot to Handle" (Non-album track)
|align="center"| –
|align="center"| –
|align="center"| –
|align="center"| –
|align="center"| –
|align="center"| –
|align="center"| –
|align="center"| –
|align="center"| –
|-
| "Black Fool's Gold"b/w "Life Gets Hard on Easy Street"
|align="center"| –
|align="center"| –
|align="center"| –
|align="center"| –
|align="center"| –
|align="center"| –
|align="center"| –
|align="center"| –
|align="center"| –
|-
|1980
|"Goodbye Marie"b/w "Love Has Made a Woman Out of You"
|align="center"| 17
|align="center"| –
|align="center"| –
|align="center"| 19
|align="center"| –
|align="center"| –
|align="center"| –
|align="center"| –
|align="center"| –
|rowspan="3"|Bobby Goldsboro
|-
|rowspan="3"|1981
|"Alice Doesn't Love Here Anymore"b/w "Green Eyed Woman, Nashville, Blues"
|align="center"| 20
|align="center"| –
|align="center"| –
|align="center"| 34
|align="center"| 41
|align="center"| –
|align="center"| –
|align="center"| –
|align="center"| –
|-
|"Love Ain't Never Hurt Nobody"b/w "Wings of an Eagle"
|align="center"| 19
|align="center"| –
|align="center"| –
|align="center"| –
|align="center"| 33
|align="center"| –
|align="center"| –
|align="center"| –
|align="center"| –
|-
| "The Round-Up Saloon"b/w "Green Eyed Woman, Nashville, Blues" (from Bobby Goldsboro)
|align="center"| 31
|align="center"| –
|align="center"| –
|align="center"| –
|align="center"| 38
|align="center"| –
|align="center"| –
|align="center"| –
|align="center"| –
| rowspan="2"| The Round-Up Saloon
|-
|1982
|"Lucy and the Stranger"b/w "Out Run the Sun"
|align="center"| 49
|align="center"| –
|align="center"| –
|align="center"| –
|align="center"| –
|align="center"| –
|align="center"| –
|align="center"| –
|align="center"| –
|}Key: 1''' Indicates titles that were awarded gold disc status.

References

Country music discographies
Discographies of American artists